

High temperature

Low Temperatures

Overseas departments and regions extremes

Overseas collectivities

Top 10 warmest days in Paris
This list consists of the 10 warmest days ever recorded in Paris, the capital city of France. 

1. 41.9°C, 25 July 2019

2. 40.3°C, 19 July 2022

3. 40.0°C, 12 August 2003

4. 39.9°C, 6 August 2003

5. 39.8°C, 24 July 2019

6. 39.6°C, 11 August 2003

7. 39.5°C, 31 July 2020

8. 39.2°C, 10 August 2003

9. 39.2°C, 28 July 1947

10. 39.0°C, 1 July 2015

Notes

External links
Records de chaleur
Records de froid
Le records de temperature - Quelques records en France et ailleurs
Records absolus en France
Les records de chaleur en France
Les records de froid en France

Climate of France
France-related lists
France